The NatCarb geoportal provides access to geospatial information and tools concerning carbon sequestration in the United States.

External links
National Energy Technology Laboratory
Carbon Sequestration Regional Partnerships

References
 Carr, T.R., P.M. Rich, and J.D. Bartley.  2007.  The NATCARB geoportal: linking distributed data from the Carbon Sequestration Regional Partnerships.  Journal of Map and Geography Libraries (Geoscapes), "Special Issue on Department of Energy (DOE) Geospatial Science Innovations".  In Press.

Carbon capture and storage